Leander Rowing Club may refer to:
 Leander Club, in Henley, England, founded 1818 and one of the oldest rowing clubs in the world
 Leander Boat Club (Canada), founded 1927 in Hamilton, Ontario
 Leander Rowing Club, a previous rowing club (1877–1895), also in Hamilton, Ontario

See also
 Burton Leander Rowing Club, in Burton upon Trent, England